The 2012 TAC Cup season was the 21st season of the TAC Cup competition. Oakleigh Chargers have won there 2nd premiership title after defeating Gippsland Power in the grand final by a 1-point thriller.

Ladder

Grand Final

References

NAB League
Nab League